Case Closed is a 1988 American made-for-television film. The film starred Charles Durning and Byron Allen.  Byron Allen was also the co-writer and co-producer on the film. It was directed by Dick Lowry. The film was shot in Atlanta, Georgia, and was broadcast on CBS on April 19, 1988.

Plot
Michael Brockman, a hip young black police detective, uncovers a suspicious link between three recent murders and an unsolved, 15-year old cold case involving the theft of The Third Star of Africa diamond.

Desperate for a lead, he seeks the reluctant assistance of gruff Les Kabalski, the now retired police officer who investigated the diamond case - the only case he never solved.  This unlikely pair strikes up a strange partnership full of arguments about love, life and the law.

High-powered action mixes with high-spirited comedy (Brockman's quicksilver tongue often gets him into trouble with killers, cuties and other police officers) as the two men follow a deadly trail of murders through a contemporary Los Angeles of transvestites and midget wrestlers, capped by some hair-raising car chases.

Reception
Don Shirley of the Los Angeles Times gave the movie a negative review.

References

1988 television films
1988 films
CBS network films
Films shot in Atlanta
American police detective films
Films directed by Dick Lowry
Films scored by Sylvester Levay
1980s American films